Żuk Nowy  (Novyi Zhuk) is a village in the administrative district of Gmina Harasiuki, within Nisko County, Subcarpathian Voivodeship, in south-eastern Poland.

The village has a population of 60.

References

Nowy Zuk